The Golem is a soundtrack written and performed by Black Francis at the 2008 San Francisco International Film Festival for the 1920 film The Golem: How He Came into the World.

The soundtrack was released in 2010 as a 5-disc set. Only 500 copies were made, and was released exclusively for purchase from Blackfrancis.net. The set included 2 CDs containing the studio recordings, 2 CDs containing the original 2008 live performance at San Francisco International Film Festival, a DVD of The Golem: How He Came into the World with the soundtrack synced to the film, and a book containing chord charts by Nick Vincent and lyrics by Black Francis for The Golem. Each of the 500 copies were signed by Black Francis, and each were wrapped in brown paper and sealed with a "Black Francis" marked wax stamp.

A "rock songs" version, according to Francis, was released to the public in 2011. This version contains only the substantial songs, leaving out the reprises and themes that were included with the box set.

Background
In April 2008, Black Francis told the Village Voice, "I'm performing it in a couple of weeks down in San Francisco at this film festival. The requisite there is to show up with some music and perform it in some way along to this movie that they're screening. And so I said, "Well, that sounds fun, but I have to sort of make a record." I have to have some sort of blueprint, you know. So I went down to San Francisco a couple of weeks ago and made a record with Eric Feldman producing. ... It took about a week, including the writing."

Track listing

One-disc edition

Personnel
 Musicians
 Black Francis – vocals, rhythm guitar
 Duane Jarvis – lead guitar
 Joseph Pope – bass
 Ralph Carney – horns
 Eric Drew Feldman – keyboards, synthetics
 Jason Carter – drums, percussion
 Roy Zimmerman – emcee at live recording 
Technical
 Eric Drew Feldman – producer
 Jason Carter – engineer, mixing, photography
 Gabriel Shepard – engineer
 Thaddeus Moore – engineer
 Bobby Mack – live recording engineer
 Mark Chalecki – mastering
 Mark Lemhouse – design, layout 
 Wesley Curtis – photography (album cover and band)

References

2010 soundtrack albums
Black Francis albums
2010 live albums
Cooking Vinyl live albums
Cooking Vinyl soundtracks
Horror film soundtracks